Deulia is a census town in the Deganga CD block in the Barasat Sadar subdivision of the North 24 Parganas district in the state of West Bengal, India.

Geography

Location

Berachampa and Deganga are located nearby.

Area overview
The area covered in the map alongside is largely a part of the north Bidyadhari Plain. located in the lower Ganges Delta. The country is flat. It is a little raised above flood level and the highest ground borders the river channels.54.67% of the people of the densely populated area lives in the urban areas and 45.33% lives in the rural  areas.

Note: The map alongside presents some of the notable locations in the subdivision. All places marked in the map are linked in the larger full screen map.

Civic administration

CD block HQ
The headquarters of Deganga CD block are located at Deulia.

Demographics
According to the 2011 Census of India, Deulia had a total population of 9,633, of which 4,938 (51%) were males and 4,725 (49%) were females. Population below 0–6 years was 895. The total number of literate persons in Deulia was 7,438 (85.12% of the population over 6 years).

Infrastructure
As per District Census Handbook 2011, Deulia covered an area of 2.7393 km2. It had 5 primary schools, 3 middle schools, 3 secondary school and 1 senior secondary school. The nearest degree college was 0.5 km away at Kaulkepara. The nearest hospital was 12 km away, the nearest dispensary/ health centre (without any bed) was 1 km away, the nearest family welfare centre was 12 km away, the nearest maternity and child welfare centre (without any bed) was 1 km away and the nearest maternity clinic was 15 km away.

Transport
State Highway 2 passes through Deulia.

See also
  Map Deganga on Page 445 of District Census Handbook.

References

Cities and towns in North 24 Parganas district